Lobería is a town in Buenos Aires Province, Argentina. It is the administrative centre for Lobería Partido.

References

External links

 Municipal website
 Tourism Official website

Populated places in Buenos Aires Province
Populated places established in 1891
1891 establishments in Argentina